Wen Zhong was an advisor in the state of Yue in the Spring and Autumn period

Wen Zhong may also refer to:

 Wen Zhong (Investiture of the Gods), a fictional character

See also
Wenzong (disambiguation)
Wen Zhang